, also known as NieA under 7, is a doujinshi manga series created by graphic designer Yoshitoshi ABe and later published by Kadokawa Shoten on their monthly Shōnen magazine Monthly Ace Next from October 1999 to January 2001. The manga revolves around a poor, introverted student named Mayuko Chigasaki, who lives above a Japanese bathhouse, and a freeloading, freewheeling outcast alien named NieA, who lives in Mayuko's closet.

The manga is adapted into a 13-episode anime series by Triangle Staff and aired on WOWOW from April 16 to July 19, 2000. Much of the anime's staff also worked on Serial Experiments Lain, as producer Yasuyuki Ueda suggested the team work on a lighter anime as relief from the dark, heavily psychological Serial Experiments Lain. The character Chiaki, a ufology fanatic, shares a name with Chiaki J. Konaka, the script writer for  Serial Experiments Lain.

Plot
Set in a retro-future setting, the series revolves around Mayuko Chigasaki, a high school graduate who goes to cram school in preparation for college. However, due to having no place to settle in, she decided to live in a bathhouse in the countryside, which is in a financial crisis due to having no customers. Even worse, she has to live with an alien girl named NieA, who has no antenna and is considered an "under-seven", a class despised by other aliens due to being the lowest of their kind.

The series touches lightly upon issues of discrimination, stereotypes, social alienation, cultural assimilation and city life versus countryside living. Mayuko, who attends a cram school, is a young girl living away from her family and expresses a lot of melancholy. NieA, who is apparently placed in an inferior class by her fellow aliens due to being a physical minority among them, immediately accuses anyone who calls her a "stupid no-antenna" or the like, of discrimination. Other aliens adopt various stereotypical cultural styles, such as Chada who dresses in Indian attire and opens a convenience store, or Karna who chooses to associate herself with the Chinese Revolution. This theme of the outsider alien is carried through in the brief comic live-action sequence which ends each episode, "Dalgit's Tidbit of Indian Information."

Characters

Mayuko "Mayu" Chigasaki is a student at the Ipponmatsu Cram School who lives in a rented room at the Enohana Bathhouse. She is hardworking, polite, honest, and very self-conscious. Mayuko spends all of her time and energy just making ends meet. She shares an apartment with NieA, who she often refers to as a "freeloader".

NieA is a lower-class or "under-seven" alien, who has no antenna. She lives with Mayuko and builds spaceships out of junk. She shares an apartment with Mayuko, who often argues with her about money and food.

Genzo is Mayuko's childhood friend who has dreadlocks and is stoic in nature. He is usually seen carrying sacks of rice or a bottle crate of bottled drinks as a present to Mayuko and NieA.

Chada is an unintentionally perverted alien disguised as an Indian man. He is the store manager of the AM 11 PM 7 convenience store, where his alien meetings are usually held at noon. He is also the owner of the short-lived Space King Bathhouse as a rival to the Enohana Bathhouse.

Momo is an old lady with few words who works at the Enohana Bathhouse.

Chiaki is Mayuko's easygoing classmate at the Ipponmatsu Cram School who is also a ufology fanatic. She is usually seen with a laptop full of alien stickers.

Shuhei is the owner of the Karuchie European Restaurant. He is shown to be clumsy and absentminded.

Chie is Shuhei's daughter. She is shown to be independent and mature for her age.

Kotomi is the current owner and manager of the Enohana Bathhouse, which is in financial crisis due to the scarcity of customers.

Geronimo is an alien who wears sunglasses and a beanie. He attends Chada's alien meetings. He is revealed to be a deadbeat celebrity for a children's show with an antenna shaped like a flower.

Nenji is the boilerman of the Enohana Bathhouse who has a crush on Kotomi. Ironically, he goes berserk whenever he sees fire.

Karna is a higher-class or "high-seven" alien who attends Chada's alien meetings. She has an antenna shaped like a lollipop that can receive Beijing radio broadcasts from across the ocean, but it malfunctions at unexpected moments.

Media

Manga
NieA_7 was created by Yoshitoshi ABe as an independent doujinshi manga following the end of Serial Experiments Lain. The manga was picked up by Kadokawa Shoten, initially serialized on their monthly magazine Monthly Ace Next from October 1999 to January 2001 with a total of 14 chapters over 2 tankōbon volumes. An artbook titled NieA_7 Scrap was published in June 2001. The manga was republished in a single kanzenban volume on 26 October 2012, under the title NieA_7 Recycle.

Chapters

Anime
The anime adaptation titled  was animated by Triangle Staff, chief directed by Tomokazu Tokoro and written and directed by Takuya Satō. It aired on the Japanese BS Satellite channel WOWOW from April 16 to July 19, 2000. The opening theme is titled  by SION while the ending theme is titled  by Maria Yamamoto. For episode 13, the ending theme is "KA MOA'E" by Yoshio Owa.

Geneon Entertainment licensed the anime outside Japan before it went out of print. Discotek Media have rescued the license and released it on DVD and Blu-ray on February 27, 2018.

Episodes

References

External links
 
 

2000 anime television series debuts
Anime with original screenplays
Articles with underscores in the title
Discotek Media
Kadokawa Dwango franchises
Geneon USA
NBCUniversal Entertainment Japan
Shōnen manga
Extraterrestrials in anime and manga